F-15,599, also known as NLX-101, is a potent and selective 5-HT1A receptor full agonist. It displays functional selectivity (also known as "biased agonism") by strongly activating 5-HT1A receptors in the postsynaptic prefrontal cortex while having little effect on somatodendritic autoreceptors in the raphe nucleus. As a result, it has been touted as a preferential postsynaptic 5-HT1A receptor agonist and has been investigated as a novel potential antidepressant.

In cognitive tests in rodent, F-15,599 attenuates memory deficits elicited by the NMDA receptor antagonist PCP, suggesting that it may improve cognitive function in disorders such as schizophrenia.

A subsequent study showed that F-15,599 reduces breathing irregularity and apneas observed in mice with mutations of the MeCP2 gene. Dysruption of MeCP2 gene expression underlies Rett syndrome, a debilitating neurodevelopmental orphan disease.

F-15,599 was discovered and initially developed by Pierre Fabre Médicament, a French pharmaceuticals company. In September 2013, F-15,599 was out-licensed to Neurolixis, a California-based biotechnology company. Neurolixis announced that it intends to re-purpose F-15,599 for the treatment of Rett syndrome. and obtained Orphan Drug designation from the United States Food and Drug Administration (FDA) and from the European Commission for this indication.

Researchers at the University of Bristol are investigating the activity of F-15599 in animal models of Rett Syndrome, with support from the International Rett Syndrome Foundation. In June 2015, the Rett Syndrome Research Trust awarded a grant to Neurolixis to advance F-15599 to clinical development.

See also
 Befiradol (F-13,640)
 Eptapirone (F-11,440)

References

External links
 F-15599 - AdisInsight

Amines
Piperidines
Pyrimidines
Benzamides
Chloroarenes
Organofluorides
5-HT1A agonists
Fluoroarenes